Frank Annunzio (January 12, 1915 – April 8, 2001) was an American politician from Chicago, Illinois.

Annunzio, an Italian-American, was born in Chicago, where he remained for his entire childhood and much of his adult life. He attended Crane Technical High School and DePaul University. He then had careers as a high school teacher and labor leader of the United Steelworkers of America. Under governor Adlai Stevenson II, he served as the state's Secretary of Labor from 1949 to 1952.

In 1964, Annunzio was elected to the United States House of Representatives from a district in Chicago as a member of the United States Democratic Party. He was re-elected 13 times and served from 1965 to 1993, deciding not to run for reelection in 1992. He was chairman of several committees including the House Administration Committee during his later terms in congress, and was particularly notable for serving on a subcommittee for consumer affairs. In 1989 he urged people to burn credit cards in order to drive down interest rates and stop themselves from going into debt.

Annunzio died in Chicago from complications arising from Parkinson's disease and was interred in the Queen of Heaven Cemetery.

References

External links

 Congressman Frank Annunzio Photo Collection - from the University of Illinois at Chicago digital collections
 

1915 births
2001 deaths
DePaul University alumni
State cabinet secretaries of Illinois
Politicians from Chicago
United Steelworkers people
American people of Italian descent
Catholics from Illinois
Deaths from Parkinson's disease
Neurological disease deaths in Illinois
Democratic Party members of the United States House of Representatives from Illinois
20th-century American politicians